Class 2900 may refer to:

Bangladesh Railway Class 2900, a diesel-electric locomotive
GWR 2900 Class, a UK steam locomotive